The following railroads operate in the US state of New Mexico.

Common freight carriers
Arizona Eastern Railway (AZER)
BNSF Railway (BNSF)
New Mexico Central Railroad (NMC)
Southwestern Railroad (SW)
Texas and New Mexico Railroad (TXN)
Union Pacific Railroad (UP)

Private freight carriers
Escalante Western Railway
Navajo Mine Railroad

Passenger carriers

Amtrak (AMTK)
Cumbres and Toltec Scenic Railroad
New Mexico Rail Runner Express (NMRX)

Defunct railroads

Private
Silver City, Pinos Altos and Mogollon Railroad
United States Potash Railroad

Electric
Albuquerque Traction Company
Citizens' Traction Company
City Electric Company
Las Vegas Railway and Power Company
Las Vegas and Hot Springs Electric Railway, Light and Power Company
Las Vegas Transit Company

Notes

References

Association of American Railroads (2003), Railroad Service in New Mexico (PDF). Retrieved July 3, 2005.

New Mexico
 
 
Railroads